Puyallup may refer to:

 Puyallup (tribe), a Native American tribe
 Puyallup, Washington, a city
 Puyallup High School
 Puyallup School District
 Puyallup station, a Sounder commuter rail station 
 Washington State Fair, formerly the Puyallup Fair
 Puyallup River, a river in the U.S. state of Washington
 Lake Puyallup, developed along the south edge of the Puget Sound Glacier
 Puyallup Glacier, a glacier on the west flank of Mount Rainier in Washington
 , a Washington State ferry
 Puyallup (YT-806), a United States Navy Valiant-class harbor tug